The Pennsylvania State Game Lands Number 36 are Pennsylvania State Game Lands in Bradford County in Pennsylvania in the United States providing hunting, bird watching, and other activities.

Geography
State Game Lands Number 36 is in Franklin and Monroe Townships in Bradford County. A portion of the eastern parcel of the Game Lands is on Kellogg Mountain (summit elevation ). The Game Lands shares a border with Pennsylvania State Game Lands Number 12 to the west.

Statistics

References

036
Protected areas of Bradford County, Pennsylvania